Kevin Anderson (born September 17, 1971) is a retired American soccer midfielder who played professionally in the Major League Soccer and the USL A-League.  He is the head coach of the Columbia University men’s soccer team.

Player

Youth
In 1989, Anderson began his collegiate career at George Mason University.  He transferred to Southern Connecticut State University after his sophomore season.  He was an NSCAA First Team as the Owls won the 1992 NCAA Division II Men's Soccer Championship.  He graduated with a bachelor's degree in liberal studies.

Professional
In 1993, Anderson began his professional career with the Boston Storm, which played a six-game independent schedule that year.  In 1994, Anderson remained with the Storm as the team competed in the USISL. In 1995, he moved to the Long Island Rough Riders, where he played for three seasons.   Anderson and his teammates won the 1995 USISL championship.  In 1998, he signed with the Minnesota Thunder where he was named team captain.  The Thunder fell in the USISL championship final that season as Anderson was named Second Team All League.  That season, he also scored the USL goal of the year.  On February 8, 1998, the Colorado Rapids selected Anderson in the first round (seventh overall) of the 1999 MLS Supplemental Draft.  On April 19, 2000, the Rapids traded Anderson to the Tampa Bay Mutiny in exchange for a third-round pick in the 2001 MLS SuperDraft and a second-round pick in the 2002 MLS SuperDraft. Over two seasons, the Mutiny twice sent Anderson on loan to the Charleston Battery of the USL A-League.  The Mutiny waived Anderson on August 1, 2001.  On August 2, 2001, Anderson signed with the Charleston Battery.  He would finish the 2001 USL season with the Battery, then continue to play for them in 2002.  In 2003, he finished his career with the Minnesota Thunder.

International
Anderson also spent time with the United States U-17 and U-20 teams.

Coach
In 1993, Anderson spent one season as an assistant coach with the Columbia Lions men’ soccer team. Anderson would also coach the Branford High School boys soccer team of Connecticut in the 95/96 and 96/97 season.  He later served as an assistant with Southern Connecticut State.  In 2004, Anderson returned to Columbia as an assistant, spending time as acting head coach in 2006.  Later that year, he moved to Boston College as an assistant to Ed Kelly.  In December 2008, Anderson became head coach of the Columbia University men’s soccer team.

In addition to his duties with Columbia, Anderson was also the head coach of New York Cosmos B in the National Premier Soccer League for one year, 2018.

References

External links
 Columbia University: Kevin Anderson
 
 Charleston Battery: Kevin Anderson

Living people
1971 births
American soccer coaches
American soccer players
Boston Storm players
Charleston Battery players
Colorado Rapids players
Columbia Lions men's soccer coaches
George Mason Patriots men's soccer players
Long Island Rough Riders players
Minnesota Thunder players
Major League Soccer players
Raleigh (Capital) Express players
Southern Connecticut Fighting Owls men's soccer players
Tampa Bay Mutiny players
A-League (1995–2004) players
MLS Pro-40 players
Soccer players from New York (state)
USL Second Division players
USISL Select League players
USISL players
Colorado Rapids draft picks
United States men's youth international soccer players
United States men's under-20 international soccer players
People from Rockville Centre, New York
Association football midfielders
Sportspeople from Nassau County, New York
Southern Connecticut State Fighting Owls coaches
Boston College Eagles men's soccer coaches